American singer Camila Cabello has released three studio albums, one soundtrack album, one extended play (EP), 29 singles (including 7 as a featured artist), 4 promotional singles, and 34 music videos. According to RIAA, Cabello has sold 38.5 million albums and singles in the United States. Her 2017 smash hit "Havana" is certified diamond in the US, making her the first hispanic female artist to do so. Billboard listed Cabello as the 87th Top Artists of the 2010s, as well as the 33rd Top Social 50 of the Decade. Her debut album Camila placed at No. 142 on Billboard 200 Decade-End Chart, while "Havana" was placed at No. 59 on Billboard Hot 100 Decade-End chart respectively.

Cabello began to establish herself as a solo artist with the release of several collaborations, including "Bad Things" with Machine Gun Kelly, which peaked at number four on the US Billboard Hot 100 in 2016. After leaving musical girl group Fifth Harmony in December 2016, she released the solo single "Crying in the Club" to a modest performance. Refocusing her sound to Latin-influenced music, her eponymous debut studio album Camila (2018) debuted at number one on the US Billboard 200. The album's lead single, "Havana", featuring American rapper Young Thug, became the best-selling digital single of 2018 worldwide according to the International Federation of the Phonographic Industry (IFPI), with equivalent sales of 19 million units globally.

In June 2019, Cabello and Canadian singer Shawn Mendes released their duet "Señorita", from the deluxe edition of Mendes' third studio album. The song became the third best-selling single of 2019 worldwide, with combined sales and track-equivalent streams of 16.1 million units globally. "Senorita" was included on Cabello's second studio album Romance released on December 6, 2019, Romance was supported by "Liar" and "Shameless" and spawned the hit "My Oh My" which peaked at number 12 on the US Billboard Hot 100. Romance peaked at number 3 on the US Billboard 200, and number 1 in Canada. 

In July 2021 Cabello released the "Don't Go Yet" the first single from her 3rd studio album Familia. "Don't Go Yet" peaked at number 28 on the Billboard Global 200. Cabello then followed this up in March 2022 with the release of her 2nd single from Familia, "Bam Bam" ft Ed Sheeran. "Bam Bam" became a global hit, peaking at number 5 on the Billboard Global 200, and number 21 on the US Billboard Hot 100. Familia was released on April 8, 2022, and though it performed modestly in the US, peaking at number 10 on the US Billboard 200, it did well internationally, peaking at number 6 in Canada, number 9 in the UK and number 4 in Spain, the latter two her highest entries on those charts since Camila.

Albums

Studio albums

Soundtrack albums

Extended plays

Singles

As lead artist

As featured artist

Promotional singles

Other charted songs

Guest appearances

Music videos

Songwriting credits

See also
 List of songs recorded by Camila Cabello
 List of artists who reached number one in the United States

Notes

References

Discography
Discographies of American artists
Discographies of Cuban artists